Parliamentary elections were held in Macedonia on 5 July 2006. The result was a victory for the VMRO-DPMNE-led coalition, which won 45 of the 120 seats.

Electoral system
The 120 seats were elected from six 20-seat constituencies by proportional representation. Seats were allocated using the d'Hondt method with an electoral threshold of 5%.

Conduct
The international community sent 6,000 observers to monitor electoral procedures, as NATO and European Union officials saw the elections as a key test of Macedonian ambitions of joining both organizations after local elections in March 2005 were marred by irregularities. The campaign was marked by serious cross-political confrontations, occasionally resulting in violence, mainly between the two major ethnic Albanian parties, the Democratic Union for Integration (DUI) and the Democratic Party of Albanians (DPA). The situation was seen as seriously tarnishing the international reputation of the country. As the confrontations between the ethnic Albanian parties intensified, a diplomatic offensive from Western officials took place to put an end to the irregularities. These efforts were supported by the ethnic Macedonian parties, but also by calls from the Albanian and Kosovan prime ministers. However, the situation did not improve significantly. On 22 June 2006 there were clashes between the two major ethnic Macedonian parties VMRO-DPMNE and the SDSM  in the center of Skopje.

The representatives of the EU and the United States continued with their efforts to stop the irregularities. NATO warned the Macedonian government that pre-election violence risked delays to the country's ambitions to join the military alliance. Problems within the Macedonian bloc stopped immediately, and incidents between the Albanian parties also progressively stopped. The last week of the campaign was calm, with almost no incidents. There were no major problems on election day, with only minor irregularities in the western part of the country. The counting of the votes also passed almost without any objections. The Macedonian government, the European Union and the United States dubbed the elections "a success".

Results
The results showed a clear victory for the coalition led by VMRO-DPMNE, which won 45 of the 120 seats. The centre-left coalition led by the SDSM won 35 seats. The majority of Albanian votes went to the DUI–PDP coalition (17 seats), while the DPA won 11 seats. Other parties that won seats included the New Social Democratic Party (7 seats), VMRO-NP (6 seats), Democratic Renewal of Macedonia (1 seat) and the Party for European Future (1 seat).

Aftermath
After unsuccessful negotiations between VMRO-DPMNE and DUI, VMRO-DPMNE  leader Nikola Gruevski decided to form a government with the DPA. After a tough negotiation process (especially between VMRO-DPMNE and NSDP), in August 2006 Gruevski announced that the new government would be composed of VMRO-DPMNE, DPA, NSDP, DOM, and PEI, with the coalition partners holding 65 of the 120 seats in parliament.

The DUI-PDP coalition started protests throughout the Albanian-dominated parts of the country due to their exclusion from the coalition. In May 2007, the PDP accepted Gruevski's offer to join the government, and in June the PDP became a coalition partner.

See also 
History of the Republic of Macedonia

References

Elections in North Macedonia
Macedonia
Parliamentary election
July 2006 events in Europe